Rugolo may refer to:

 Rugolo (Sarmede), frazione of comune Sarmede, Veneto, Italy

People 
 Barb Rugolo, American poker player
 Joe Rugolo (born 1965), Australian rules footballer
 Michele Rugolo (born 1982), Italian racing driver
 Pete Rugolo (1915–2011), Sicilian-born jazz composer and arranger
 Frank Rugolo (born 1963), Australian rules footballer